Boris Kriukow (January 19, 1895 – March 6, 1967), also known by the pseudonym Ivan Usatenko, was a Ukrainian Argentine artist. It is possible that his original surname was Kryukiv but the family kept the Russian spelling even abroad. 

Kriukow was born on January 19, 1895, in the town of Orgeev, in Bessarabia, where his father, an official of the Russian Empire, worked at the local court of justice. As a young man he studied at Fedir Krychevsky's art school in Kiev, and after finishing his training in 1918 he moved to Kamenets to teach at the local tekhnikum.

As an artist, Kriukow focused on graphic art, and in the interwar period he illustrated over 500 books, among them works by Shevchenko, Franko, Dickens, Antonenko-Davydovych, etc., as well as books for children by N. Zabila, L. Pervomaysky, and others. He was recognized as one of the best graphic artists in Ukraine. During World War II, 1943, he moved to Lviv, where he took part in an exhibition, one of his paintings being called by art critics "the jewel" of that exhibition. From 1944 to 1948 he lived in Austria, and painted under the pseudonym of Ivan Usatenko, taking part in art exhibitions in Salzburg, Innsbruck, etc.

In 1948, he emigrated to Argentina with his wife, fellow Ukrainian artist Olga Gurski, and settled in Buenos Aires, where he held personal exhibitions in the most renowned art galleries, such as Müller, Van Riel, and Whitcomb, almost yearly (1949–1965). His oil paintings were also exhibited in Canada (Toronto, 1956), and USA (New York City, 1963 and 1965).
 
At the same time, he worked as a book illustrator for both Argentine and Ukrainian publishing houses. 1950–1960 he illustrated up to 80 Ukrainian books for Mykola Denysiuk publishers, Buenos Aires. He cooperated, too, with the Julian Serediak publishing firm, editors of the "Mitla" (The Broom) humor magazine, where his own book, Smikholina (Laughter-Drops) was published (1966).
 
From 1950 until his death, he was the only illustrator for the Clásicos inolvidables ("Unforgettable Classics") collection published by Ateneo publishing house in Buenos Aires:

 Arabian Nights (1950 and 1956);
 Edgar Allan Poe: Selected Tales (1951);
 Dante Alighieri: The Divine Comedy (1952);
 Giovanni Boccaccio: Decamerone (1953);
 Miguel de Cervantes Saavedra: Don Quixote (1954);
 Selected Works by: Francisco de Quevedo (1957), Anatole France (1958), Émile Zola (1961).

Along with his work for Ateneo, he illustrated books for another Argentine publishing house, Atlántida:

 White Fang by Jack London (1956);
 Little Lord Fountleroy by Frances Hodgson Burnett (1956);
 Little Men (1955) and Little Women (1964) by Louisa M. Alcott;
 Heidi (1957) by J. Spiry;
 The Adventures of Buffalo Bill (1964) by W. F. Cody.

Also for Atlántida, he produced colorful paintings of animals and the like, for smaller children.

After his death in 1967, the well known Ukrainian writer and poet Igor Kaczurowskyj (the painter's son in law) was inspired by some twenty pictures Kriukow had made, in his spare time, on the subject of the old Ukrainian tale about the cat "Mister Kotsky", to write a long poem for children, which, many years later (1992) was to be published in Ukraine, illustrated by these same pictures from the artist's heritage.

In 1965, he was invited to exhibit in Buenos Aires Town Hall, after having received two important rewards: 1964, for his drawing Don Quixote, presented at an international art competition of the "Codex" publishing house, Madrid, and for his drawing Don Segundo Sombra, from "Codex Argentina".
 
He is the author of a large oil picture of Cardinal Josyf Slipy, and of the Argentine heroes José de San Martín (at the battle of Chacabuco; Buenos Aires Town Hall), and Admiral Guillermo Brown (unfinished; donated by his family to the Brown Institute after his death.

His last, finished, work was the apsis mosaic of The Virgin and Child, executed for the Ukrainian cathedral of the Holy Protection in Buenos Aires, and crowned by Pope John Paul II, in 1988, the millennium of Christianity in Ukraine.

Boris Kriukow died in Buenos Aires, on March 6, 1967. Posthumous exhibitions were held in New York City and Toronto (1969), Munich (1977), and Bad Aibling (Bavaria, 1980). In 1970, a monograph about him ("Boris Kriukow") in Ukrainian, Spanish, and English was published.

Further reading 

Heino Zernask: Boris Kriukow y sus mundos imaginarios. LA NACION, March 10, 1968.

Andriy Yaremchuk: Velyka elehiya oro zemlyu bat'kiv. UKRAINS'KA KULTURA, # 5–6, 2000.

Gedächtnisausstellung Boris Kriukow. MITTEILUNEN # 14, Munich 1977.

Ilustraciones del Quijote han sido expuestas. LA NACION, July 23, 1964.

Don Segundo Sombra habla ucraniano. EL LABORISTA, March 18, 1956.

Brown pintado por un artista ucraniano. DEL MAR, a magazine of the Brown Institute, # 17, V/XII, 1981.

Alpheda Puluj Hohenthal: Introduktsiya do propam'yatnoyi vystavky Borysa Kryukova v UVU; Alexander H. Puluj: Spohady pro Borysa Kryukova. VYZVOLNY SHLYAKH, # 10, 1977.

Lyudmyla Tarnashynska: I dysonansom – "spolokhani koni". LITERATURNA UKRAINA, August 17, 1995.

Igor Kaczurowskyj: Stobarvna put'''. NOVI DNI, May 1977.

Igor Kaczurowskyj: Khudozhnyk Borys Kryukov ochyma pys'mennyka''. KYIVS'KA STAROVYNA, # 1, 1998.

References

1895 births
1967 deaths
People from Orhei
People from Orgeyevsky Uyezd
20th-century Ukrainian painters
20th-century Ukrainian male artists
Ukrainian male painters